Rendezvous Island South Provincial Park is a provincial park in British Columbia, Canada, located in the Rendezvous Islands in Calm Channel, to the east of the north end of Read Island in the Discovery Islands at the northern end of the Strait of Georgia region.  The park contains a total of 164 ha. 113 ha. of it upland, 53 ha. of it foreshore.

References

Provincial Parks of the Discovery Islands
Provincial parks of British Columbia
1997 establishments in British Columbia
Protected areas established in 1997